Eka is a Bangladeshi actress and model who acted in films and television dramas and worked in TVCs as model. She acted in more than 30 films.

Biography
Eka made her debut in Dhallywood with Teji which was directed by Kazi Hayat and Manna was her co-star. After this film she acted in Dhor. This film was also directed by Kazi Hayat and Manna was her co-star in that film too.

Selected filmography
 Teji
 Dhor
 Baba Keno Asami
 Ajker Dapot
 Bahadur Sontan
 Raj Golam
 Police Officer
 Moron Niye Khela

References

Living people
Bangladeshi film actresses
Bangladeshi female models
Bangladeshi television actresses
Year of birth missing (living people)